Herbert Omar Dunn (May 19, 1857 – March 6, 1939) was a Rear Admiral of the United States Navy.

Early years
He was born on May 19, 1857 in Westerly, Rhode Island. In 1877, as a cadet, Dunn sailed on the sloop-of-war  on a voyage to the South Atlantic.

Career
Appointed ensign on 12 March 1881, Dunn was successively promoted to Lieutenant (junior grade) on 1 July 1887, lieutenant on 17 February 1893, and lieutenant commander on 1 July 1900.

By 1917, in the middle of the Great War, and now a vice-admiral, he was appointed the first commander of U.S. naval forces stationed at the U.S. Naval Base at Ponta Delgada, Azores. Dunn distinguished himself with the help he provided to the civil population when the great 1918 flu pandemic killed 2,000 people on the island.

In 1919 Dunn was in put in charge of an inquiry of homosexual activities among naval personnel at Newport, Rhode Island Navy bases.

Later years
Dunn retired in 1921 with the rank of Rear Admiral, and died in Baltimore, Maryland on March 6, 1939.

References

1857 births
1939 deaths
United States Navy rear admirals